Ab-normal Beauty (死亡寫真, "Photos of Death") (also Sei mong se jun) is a 2004 Hong Kong horror film directed and co-written by Oxide Pang. It stars Race Wong and Rosanne Wong of the Cantopop group 2R.

Plot
Jiney, an art and photography student, wins an award for her work. Her male friend and co-student, Anson, congratulates her but she tells him that although she won an award, she is unhappy with the work. Her friend Jas, who she lives with, takes her from school on a 'date'. They go out to take photographs. 

Jiney's mother tells her that she is going away on business for a month. Later, she witnesses a fatal car accident and takes photographs of it. She finds herself obsessed with death and begins to take photographs of more explicit death subjects - chickens being killed, fish being scaled, dead birds and others. She talks about suicide, and there are flashbacks to an apparent incident from her youth when she was sexually abused by some young boys..

Cast
Race Wong as Jiney
Rosanne Wong as Jas
Anson Leung as Anson
Michelle Yim as Jiney's mother
Cub Chin as Professor
Ekin Cheng as Man in car crash

See also
Leave Me Alone (2004 thriller film)

External links
 
 
 
 HK Cinemagic entry

2004 films
Films directed by Oxide Pang
Hong Kong horror films
2004 horror films
Films about photographers
Films about snuff films
2000s Hong Kong films